Club Atlético General Paz Juniors is a sports club, located in Córdoba, Argentina. Although other sports are practised there (such as basketball, tennis or taekwondo) the club is mostly known for its football team, which currently plays in the regionalised 5th level of Argentine football league system, the Torneo Argentino C.

Titles
Torneo Argentino A: 1
1999-2000

See also
List of football clubs in Argentina
Argentine football league system

References

External links
Official website 

Football clubs in Córdoba Province, Argentina
Association football clubs established in 1914
Sport in Córdoba, Argentina
1914 establishments in Argentina